The 1960 U.S. Figure Skating Championships was held at the Civic Ice Arena in Seattle from January 27 through 30, 1960. Medals were awarded in three colors: gold (first), silver (second), and bronze (third) in four disciplines – men's singles, ladies' singles, pair skating, and ice dancing – across three levels: senior, junior, and novice.

The event determined the U.S. teams for the 1960 Winter Olympics and 1960 World Championships.

Senior results
In the men's, ladies', and pairs' divisions, the competitions were won by the defending champions, while the vacant dance title was won by the previous year's silver medalists.

Men
Tim Brown won the compulsory figures competition over David Jenkins, but Jenkins responded with a superior free skating that included two triple jumps. He received no mark lower than 5.8 for this performance and won the title on a 4-1 ordinal decision.

Ladies
Carol Heiss built up a large lead in the compulsory figures which meant her title was never in serious doubt. However, Barbara Ann Roles captured the audience with an outstanding free skating performance.

Heiss went on to capture gold medal in the 1960 Winter Olympics, while Roles won bronze medal at the Games. At the 1960 World Championships, Heiss finished first and Roles came in third.

Pairs
Ludingtons won bronze medal at the 1960 Winter Olympics.

Ice dancing (Gold dance)

Junior results

Men

Ladies

Pairs

Ice dancing (Silver dance)

* Eliminated before Final Round

Novice results

Men

Ladies

Sources
 "The United States Championships", Skating magazine, March 1960

U.S. Figure Skating Championships
United States Figure Skating Championships, 1960
United States Figure Skating Championships, 1960
January 1960 sports events in the United States